The Anglican Church of St John the Baptist, Westbourne is situated in the village of Westbourne, West Sussex.  The church is part of the Diocese of Chichester and is dedicated to John the Baptist.

History and architecture
The Domesday Book compiled in 1086 includes two churches entered under the Manor of Warblington (which at the time incorporated the Manor of Westbourne) It is possible that one of these either Saxon or Norman foundations was in Westbourne – potential evidence for this might be traced to claims made during the church's restoration in 1865, where "large square bases of early Norman pillars" were allegedly seen on the site where the present pillars stand. The current church that stands today consists of structures dating back to the early 13th century and other appendages and renovations since then.

In the early 13th century, the church included a nave with north and south aisles extending as far west as the present east arch of the tower, and a chancel of the present size. In the late 14th century, the rector and 6th Earl of Arundel carried out considerable alterations. The nave and aisles were extended west, the old west wall being penetrated by three arches, new windows were inserted in the aisles and the chancel and the tower in the south-west corner was probably erected; following these changes, the church reached its current size. In the early 16th century, the 11th Earl of Arundel refashioned the nave in the existing Gothic perpendicular style, replacing thick pillars and round arches with tall slender pillars and three-centred flat arches. The chancel was raised and widened, and the north porch was built – at the same time, the present west tower was built and its predecessor was taken down (the remains of a pier is still visible inside the church on the south wall of the south aisle).

In 1545, the Avenue of Yew Trees was planted; it is believed that it is the oldest in the United Kingdom. In 1598, the north and south galleries were erected over the aisles, dormer windows were added, a flat ceiling was added to the nave and the singing gallery was erected under the tower. In 1770, the then-Lord of the Manor the 2nd Earl of Halifax added a spire to the tower. The spire originally had an external gallery and an ornament. In 1797, the church was re-floored partly with Purbeck stone and brick, new pews were installed, old choir stalls in the chancel were cleared and painted glass was taken out of the chancel windows. In 1860, the gallery and ornament were removed from the spire and pinnacles were removed from the tower. In 1865, extensive restoration was carried out. boxed pews, galleries and flat ceilings were cleared away, dormer windows were removed, new pine pews were placed in the church and the south porch was built. The original stone north porch was dismantled and rebuilt in oak. These changes were described by architectural scholar Nikolaus Pevsner as being "really unpleasant". In 1876, the organ chamber was built and new choir seating was installed, and Philip Mainwaring Johnston undertook further work in 1932–33. In 1957, the spire was re-shingled and the weather vane that had been blown away in 1894 was re-erected. In 1978, the vestry was extended and in 1981 the church was re-floored in stone.

All of the stained glass present today was placed in the windows between 1865 and 1912, with the exception of the west window to the south aisle that was made from a collection of older glass and placed in the window in 1840. The church graveyard was closed to new burials in 1859 and is still lined by a fine wall.

In 1892, a tin church was built in the nearby village of Woodmancote and was incorporated into the benefice of Westbourne.

Worship
Each Sunday, Parish Communion and early morning said communion are offered, together usually with a later service at the outlying church of Woodmancote or in the evening at the parish church.  Evening Worship takes a variety of forms, including evening prayer, choral evensong and reflective and creative liturgies.   On Wednesday, a morning service of Holy Communion also takes place. St John the Baptist Church uses both the Book of Common Prayer and Common Worship and seeks to offer regular services that will include worshippers of all ages.  Its activities include Sunday school, a junior section to the choir and other youth involvement. Like many other English churches, music is an important part of worship as there is a strong choral foundation that is responsible for providing choral music.

Organ

The first record of an organ at the church was made in 1819, although little is known about the instrument. In 1862, a one manual organ constructed by J. W. Walker & Sons Ltd was installed - it was enlarged fourteen years later to include a second manual (Swell division) In 1890, W. J. Haywood of London carried out additions to the organ, including an 8' reed to the swell and 16' Open Wood to the pedals. Hele & Co of Plymouth rebuilt the organ in 1967, and notably replaced the mechanical action with electro-pneumatic action. In 2001, Kenneth Tickell & Co built a new organ that remains in use today. 
The organ, on the church website
Details of the Kenneth Tickell organ from the National Pipe Register

Bells

Originally the church had four bells, as recorded in 1724, but the number has risen to six in 1770 and then to eight in 1933. At present the church uses full-circle ringing and the bells are rung for each of the Sunday services. The heaviest bell, a tenor bell, weighs almost half a ton and forms an octave with the other bells.

List of rectors

 1263 William De Perry
 1302 Richard De Bourne
 1316 John De Arundel
 1331 John Appulby
 1390 Robert Pubelow
 1397 John Boor
 1399 Robert Pubelow
 1437 John Grendon
 1441 Edward Poynings
 1484 John Chamber
 1512 John Aslaby
 1520 Thomas Larbe
 1530 David Llewellyn Egerly
 1552 John Dawlyn
 1554 Richard Marshall
 1562 Henry Wilsha
 1591 Thomas Wilsha
 1614 Christopher Swale
 1645 Lewis Hughes
 1646 Thomas Prynne
 1678 George Eales
 1679 William Thomas
 1687 Richard Brereton
 1720 John Needham
 1741 Henry Dawnay
 1754 John Frankland
 1778 William de Chair Tattersall
 1829 Henry Garrett Newland
 1862 John Hanson Sterling
 1871 John Mee
 1884 Lloyd Batley Birket
 1931 Christopher Edward Vere Hodge
 1945 Maitland Theophilus Dodds
 1953 Norman Worton
 1959 Arthur Blee
 1963 John St Maur Williams
 1970 Arnold Fredrick Nicholas
 1976 Peter Michael Baden
 1985 Kenneth Grace
 1991 Bryan John Marshall
 1996 Richard John Wells
 2009 Frank Albert Wright
 2017 Andrew Peter Charles Doye

See also
Grade I listed buildings in West Sussex
List of current places of worship in Chichester (district)

References

Church of England church buildings in West Sussex
Grade I listed churches in West Sussex